Idiomarina aestuarii is a Gram-negative, rod-shaped, aerobic and non-motile bacterium from the genus of Idiomarina which has been isolated from seawater from the South Sea in Korea.

References

Bacteria described in 2010
Alteromonadales